Keagan Johannes (born ) is a South African rugby union player for the  in the United Rugby Championship and the  in the Currie Cup. His regular position is scrum-half.

He made his debut in the same fixture, coming on as a replacement scrum-half.

Honours
 Currie Cup winner (2021)

References

South African rugby union players
1999 births
Living people
Rugby union scrum-halves
Blue Bulls players
Bulls (rugby union) players